Old Hickory may refer to:

Nickname 
Andrew Jackson (1767–1845), seventh president of the United States
30th Infantry Division (United States) a unit of the Army National Guard in World Wars I and II

Places 
Old Hickory (LaCour, Louisiana), on the National Register of Historic Places listings in Louisiana
Old Hickory Historic District, on the National Register of Historic Places listings in Tennessee
Old Hickory, Tennessee, a town named for Jackson, near to the site of The Hermitage
Old Hickory Boulevard, the name of several roads in Nashville, Tennessee, named for Jackson
Old Hickory Lake, a man-made reservoir along the path of the Cumberland River in Middle Tennessee, named for Jackson
Old Hickory Lake Arboretum, an environmental study area adjacent to Old Hickory Lake in Tennessee
Old Hickory Lock and Dam, the lock and dam which hold Old Hickory Lake in Tennessee
Old Hickory Mall, an enclosed shopping mall in Jackson, Tennessee
Old Hickory Square, a square in Kerkrade, the Netherlands.